Upernavik Kujalleq (old spelling: Upernavik Kujatdleq), formerly Søndre Upernavik, is an island settlement in Avannaata municipality in northwestern Greenland. Founded in 1855 as a trading station on Qeqertaq Island, the settlement had 201 inhabitants in 2020.

Upernavik Archipelago 

Upernavik Kujalleq is the only settlement on Qeqertaq Island, which is the second largest island of Upernavik Archipelago, a vast archipelago of small islands on the coast of northeastern Baffin Bay. It is located near Qugdlungut, the southernmost point of the island, and features a heliport,

Transport 
On weekdays, Air Greenland serves the village as part of government contract, with mostly cargo helicopter flights from Upernavik Kujalleq Heliport to Kangersuatsiaq and Upernavik.

Population 
The population of Upernavik Kujalleq has remained relatively stable over the last two decades.

References 

Populated places in Greenland
Populated places of Arctic Greenland
Upernavik Archipelago
Populated places established in 1855
Avannaata
1855 establishments in the Danish colonial empire